Richard Braxton may refer to:

Richard Van Braxton, North Carolina politician
Richard Braxton, character in The Accidental Husband